Lists of Muslim scientists and scholars cover scientists and scholars who were active in the Islamic world before the modern era. They include:
List of scientists in medieval Islamic world
List of pre-modern Arab scientists and scholars
List of pre-modern Iranian scientists and scholars

Scientists and scholars
Lists of religious people lists